Marlyn Belizario Alonte-Naguiat (born July 15, 1974) is a Filipino politician who has been serving as the Member of the House of Representatives of the Philippines for Biñan since 2016. A member of the centre-right Lakas–CMD, she previously served as one of the deputy speakers of the House of Representatives from March 2021 to June 2022, as well as the 3-term Mayor of Biñan from 2007 to 2016, the Vice Mayor of Biñan from 2004 to 2007 and the Member of the then Biñan Municipal Council from 1998 to 2004.

Political career 
Her political career began when she was elected Member of Biñan Municipal Council at the 1998 local elections, which she was re-elected in 2001. In 2004, she contested for Vice Mayorship of the city, instead of seeking re-election for Councilor.

She was elected Mayor of Biñan at the 2007 local elections. Being a 33 years old during that time, she was the youngest and the first female Mayor of the city. During her mayorship, she oversaw the adoption of the new seal of the city, as well as implementing a plastic-free policy in order to promote the citizens to use bayong, an environmental-friendly traditional Filipino bag. She also organised the establishment of Polytechnic University of the Philippines Biñan.

Parliamentary career 
Formerly a long-term member of the Liberal Party, Alonte joined the centre-left PDP-Laban following her election as the representative for Biñan at the 2016 election. She was re-elected under the PDP-Laban ticket at the 2019 election.

On 25 March 2021, Alonte was elected Deputy Speaker of the House of Representatives, making her as the 33rd Deputy Speaker under the speakership of Lord Allan Velasco.

Following her re-election as the Biñan MP at the 2022 election, she left the PDP-Laban and joined the Lakas-CMD, along with 22 others. This movement was referred as "to support the newly-elected President Bongbong Marcos and the Vice President Sara Duterte" by the Lakas-CMD President Martin Romualdez.

Political positions 
Alonte has been in favor of women and children rights since her involvement into the politics. During her Biñan mayorship, she organised Kababaihan Unlad Biñan, which has been celebrating the Women's Month and holding various activities. She also focused on improvising children education of the city in order to overcome poverty. Even since being elected MP, she has been contributing for several bills and acts i.e. Republic Act No. 11510, as well as House Bill No. 8097, to enhance the lives of out-of-school youths and single parent.

Alonte is also a supporter of LGBTQ rights. She attended the 2018 Pride Month Celebration organised by the Gay Alliance for Len Alonte.

Controversies

Bribery scandal 
In February 2017, Alonte provoked a controversy when the then Secretary of Justice Vitaliano Aguirre II accused her and a former Senator Jamby Madrigal for providing  to several high-class prisoners of the New Bilibid Prison. Several newspapers reported that the bribery was in order to withdraw their testimonies against a Senator Leila de Lima.

Nevertheless, netizens criticized Aguirre for simply accusing others without any evidences. Kris Aquino, who is younger sister to the former President Benigno Aquino III, also defended Alonte, stating that she does not agree with any unproven accusations. Alonte herself also denied the accusation.

Vote buying 
Marlyn Alonte was one of the 3 Biñanense politicians — 2 others are: Mayor Arman Dimaguila and Vice Mayor Angelo Alonte, who was accused and sued for alleged vote buying for the 2022 election. According to  Manila Bulletin, one of the 3 complainants was Michael Yatco, the former Partido Federal ng Pilipinas candidate for Biñan who was defeated by Alonte.

Personal life 
A native Biñanense, Alonte is a daughter of Arthur Alonte, who served as Mayor of Biñan from 1988 to 1992, and Fe Erlinda Francisco Belizario, a daughter of philanthropist Dr. Ildefonso Belizario. She attended University of Santo Tomas, where she obtained a Bachelor in Tourism degree. She married Steve Naguiat, a cousin of Cristino Naguiat, who formerly served as the Chairman of the Philippine Amusement and Gaming Corporation. They have 2 children — Nico and Isabel.

She has a close relationship with Kris Aquino.

References

External links 
 Marlyn Alonte on Facebook

1974 births
Living people
Filipino politicians
University of Santo Tomas alumni
Lakas–CMD politicians
People from Biñan
Mayors of places in Laguna (province)
Members of the House of Representatives of the Philippines from Laguna (province)
Deputy Speakers of the House of Representatives of the Philippines